Ectothiorhodosinus is a genus of bacteria from the family of Ectothiorhodospiraceae with one known species (Ectothiorhodosinus mongolicus). Ectothiorhodosinus mongolicus has been isolated the Lake Dzun-Uldziit-Nur in the Mongolia.

References

Chromatiales
Bacteria genera
Monotypic bacteria genera
Taxa described in 2007